Ballycopeland Windmill is a functioning windmill located one mile west of Millisle, County Down, Northern Ireland. It is managed by the Historic Environment Division of the Department for Communities and is open to the public. It is known in Irish as Muileann gaoithe Bhaile Chóplainn and in Ulster-Scots as Ballycopelann Wun-mäll.
Ballycopeland is currently closed to the public, though works are due to begin in early September 2020 for restoration of the mill and a new Visitor Centre. Work is estimated to end in May 2021.

Features
The visitor centre at the miller’s house features an electrically operated model of the mill and hands-on experience of milling. There is also a restored corn-drying kiln.

History
The plastered and white-washed tapering tower is a landmark in that area and the last remaining windmill of more than hundred mills in County Down. It was owned by the McGilton family and the mill ground grain until 1915. In 1935 it was acquired by the government of Northern Ireland. Disused for many decades, in 1978, the old windmill was restored to working order again.

References

External links
Virtual visit to Ballycopeland Windmill

Buildings and structures in County Down
Windmills in Northern Ireland
Tower mills in the United Kingdom
Grinding mills in the United Kingdom
Northern Ireland Environment Agency properties
Museums in County Down
Industry museums in Northern Ireland
Mill museums in Northern Ireland